Karle is a given name and surname.

Notable persons

Given name 
 Karle Wilson Baker (1878–1960), American author
 Karle Carder-Andrews (born 1989), English football player
 Karle Hammond (born 1974), English rugby player
 Karle Warren (born 1992), American actress

Surname 
 Charles Karle (1898–1946), American rower
 Isabella Karle (1921–2017), American physical chemist
 Jerome Karle (1918–2013), American physical chemist
 John L. Karle (1894–1953), American lawyer and politician

See also

Kaarle
Karie (name)
Karlee
Karley
Karli (name)
Karlie
Karlo (name)
Karly
Karre
Karrle Tu Bhi Mohabbat